Khakheperraseneb (fl. c. 1900 BC) (also transliterated as Khakheperresenb,<ref>Walter Jackson Bate, The Burden of the Past and the English Poet (1970)</ref> Khakheperrē-sonb, Khakheperre-sonb) was an Egyptian scribe who lived during the reign of Senusret II, and is the presumed author of Sayings of Khakheperraseneb.

See also
 List of ancient Egyptian scribes

 Notes 

 References 
 The Burden of the Past and the English Poet'' (1970) by Walter Jackson Bate.

External links 
 
 Inkshed
 JSTOR: Interview with John Barth

Ancient Egyptian scribes